Dan Branch is a stream in Gasconade County in the U.S. state of Missouri. It is a tributary of the Bourbeuse River.

Dan Branch most likely derives its name from frontiersman Daniel Boone.

See also
List of rivers of Missouri

References

Rivers of Gasconade County, Missouri
Rivers of Missouri